Shawn van Rensburg is a South African dual-code rugby player. A flanker, he played his club rugby for Newport Gwent Dragons, before switching codes to play rugby league for the Celtic Crusaders.

References

Dragons RFC players
South African rugby union players
Living people
Afrikaner people
South African people of Dutch descent
South African rugby league players
Crusaders Rugby League players
Rugby union flankers
South African expatriate rugby league players
South African expatriate rugby union players
Expatriate rugby league players in Wales
Expatriate rugby union players in Wales
South African expatriate sportspeople in Wales
Year of birth missing (living people)